Re Wünsche Handelsgesellschaft (22 October 1986) BVerfGE 73, 339, is a German constitutional law and EU law case, popularly known as Solange II, concerning the conflict of law between the German national legal system and European Union law.

Facts
An EC import licensing system was challenged in the German Court. The ECJ held that the system was valid in Wünsche Handelsgesellschaft v Germany.

Judgment
The Federal Constitutional Court (Bundesverfassungsgericht) held that it would not give close scrutiny now. It considered, since the 1974 decision, the ECJ’s development of protection for fundamental rights, the adoption of declarations on rights and democracy by the Community institutions, and that all EC Member States had acceded to the European Convention on Human Rights.

This in effect meant that the authority of the ECJ in Germany was accepted by the Federal Court, so long as the ECJ rulings conformed to the principles of  German national law.

See also

European Union law
Internationale Handelsgesellschaft (Solange I)

References

Federal Constitutional Court cases
1986 in West Germany
1986 in case law